The second series of The Valleys, a British television programme based in Cardiff, Wales, began airing on 23 April 2013 on MTV with a special episode featuring the best bits from the first series. Eight regular episodes aired from 30 April to 18 June. This is the first series to feature twins Anthony and Jason Suminski, replacing Aron Williams, who quit that April. It is the final series with Leeroy Reed and Liam Powell.

Storylines

Carley, Chidgey, Jenna, Lateysha, Liam and Nicole arrive in the house and Chidgey and Carley decide to pretend that they're a couple and even share a kiss to make their lies more convincing. Jenna clearly seems to be bothered by the kiss but hides her true feelings. They're then joined by twins, Anthony and Jason, who immediately cause chaos within the house. Both turn the house upside down but are already popular with the rest of the group. However, there's a clear atmosphere between Jenna and Carley, and Liam plans on getting to the bottom of it to find out what's wrong. As Liam tells Jenna what Carley's said about her, it sparks arguments between the three of them. Carley then goes to Chidgey for comfort, and the others fear what Natalee will think when she returns. Jenna begins to get close with both of the twins but can't decide which one she likes more, but ends up kissing Anthony.

The next day, the whole group are invited out to do some modelling and Nicole to style. Chidgey's not happy when the twins take his place and are the subject of the modelling with Jenna, and Lateysha and Liam aren't impressed when Nicole dresses them up as animals. Jenna enjoys getting close to both Anthony and Jason during the photoshoot and begins to develop feelings towards them. Jenna takes Chidgey aside to discuss his relationship with Carley but he tells her the truth about how there's nothing going on between them. Getting back from their day out, the boys start a food fight until it's interrupted by Jenna's mum visiting who is appalled at what she's seen including the twins making monkey noises in her face. As always, she makes her feelings well known towards them but is shocked to hear that Jenna has been kissing one of them the night before. Lateysha's not happy when she realises there's food in her hair extensions and plots to get revenge on the boys by putting fish in their pillow cases.  As the girls demand an apology from the boys, more arguments erupt between Liam and Carley. Carley decides to take her career to the next step and privately visits Jordan to see if he can give her DJing lessons. Later that night during a night out, Liam is expecting to be called up by Jordan to DJ for the club but receives a shock when he actually asks Carley instead. This then sparks more rivalry between the pair. Jenna and Anthony also get closer during the night out, and get even closer when they return to the house. 

The girls wake Chidgey up the next day to wish him a happy birthday, but the celebrations don't last long when AK asks him to go into work to do another photoshoot, this time with Liam. When they arrive at work Chidgey is horrified to find out it's a gay photoshoot and will have to get close to Liam. Just when he thinks his day couldn't get any worse, Natalee returns to the house after apologising to AK. Natalee decides to make Chidgey jealous by flirting with Anthony, and Jenna's not happy that she's taken him away from her. Liam warns Natalee to think about Chidgey's feelings when getting close to Anthony, and tells her about Chidgey's kiss with Carley. She then confronts Carley with what she's found out, which causes more arguments and drama for Liam when Carley realises he dropped her in it. Natalee decides to put on a brave face for Carley but is clearly hurt by her actions. However, it all gets too much for her and she turns aggressive towards Carley. Carley then decides she can't cope with all the arguments in the house so packs her bags and returns home, saying goodbye to Chidgey. With the whole house shocked at Carley's departure, Natalee continues to get close to Anthony but he's worried that it will affect his friendship with Chidgey. AK decides for Chidgey, Jenna and Natalee to do her next photoshoot which is wedding themed, and to make things more awkward, Chidgey and Natalee have to be the married couple. However, there's only so much they agree to do as they refuse to kiss each other. AK then chooses Jenna to be the bride and Natalee to be the bridesmaid watching Chidgey and Jenna kiss in front of her. Natalee's horrified when AK suggests Chidgey and Jenna make a good couple. That night, Natalee sets her sights on Anthony again to make both Chidgey and Jenna jealous. Anthony and Natalee finally spend the night together. In the morning however, Natalee's due in at work but refuses to go in. AK loses her temper and drives all the way back to the house to fetch her and issues her with an ultimatum, work or go home. Natalee finally agrees to go into work. 

That night, the group go for another night out together and it all ends up with more arguments for Natalee and Chidgey as he mentions kissing Carley. Anthony's there to pick up the pieces though for Natalee and they all go home. Meanwhile, AK and Jordan visit Carley in Caerphilly and convince her to return to Cardiff to follow her dream. When the group arrive back at the house, they find Carley in the house and are all delighted that she's back. All except Liam. As the tension between Carley and Liam increases, arguments erupt between them both and Lateysha and Nicole get involved. Jordan has no choice but to step in the next day and encourage Carley and Liam to work together as DJs, but it only adds fuel to the fire and starts more arguments. Elsewhere, AK invites Anthony and Jason to do another photoshoot, this time with other female twins. Jason invites the girls to the club after the photoshoot where they meet with the rest of the group, and Natalee is far from impressed. Chidgey shows an interest in the girls making Jenna jealous, and Lateysha makes her feelings known and almost starts a fight. Chidgey then takes the twins home but fails to get them into bed. 

The next night, the group host a house party and Carley invites Millie, who previously had sex with Leeroy and kissed Chidgey. Chidgey tries his luck with Millie again leaving both Carley and Natalee hurt. Natalee decides to turn to Anthony for support and they get together again, but Carley decides to turn to the alcohol. Chidgey then catches Carley in the toilet crying and attempts to cheer her up, but she confesses her love for him. It's extremely awkward the next day as she tries to blame the confession on the alcohol, and Natalee's quick to sense tension between the two of them. After quizzing Carley over what's happened, Natalee feels uncomfortable with the situation and begins another argument. Meanwhile, Leeroy is planning a return to the house after a meeting with Jordan. Jenna receives a visit from AK and is told that someone from Nuts magazine wants to meet with her. Jason attempts to train Jenna up so she looks good for her interview and the pair get closer. Jordan tries to teach Nicole how to drive but it all turns into a disaster when she breaks his car, and Natalee apologises to Carley for the previous argument but says she still doesn't trust her to be around Chidgey. 

The following day, after spending the night in bed with Jason, Jenna receives a visit from her Mum to take her down to London for the interview. Panicking that she'll find out what she's been up to, Jenna quickly gets dressed and leaves. During her interview for Nuts, Jenna's told that she's wanted on the cover of the magazine with Lateysha. To celebrate the success of the interview, Jenna and Jason go out for a drink. Elsewhere, Leeroy returns to the house with flowers for Jenna. Everyone then meets Jenna and Jason on a night out and there's an immediate love triangle between Jenna, Jason and Leeroy as both boys try to compete for her attention. Jenna's confused over her feelings and doesn't know whom to choose but ends up going to bed alone. Leeroy leaves the next day to return to the studio, and Jenna's more confused than ever. AK has the girls doing a photoshoot the next day with animals such as snakes and spiders leaving them all scared. However, Lateysha gets involved in the photoshoot and AK regrets giving Jenna the bigger opportunity instead of Lateysha. That night, Carley decides to stay in as she's feeling unwell but Chidgey thinks it's to do with her growing feelings for him. Natalee and Chidgey call a truce on the night out but it soon turns to bickering again when her asks if he can try and pull Carley. The following day, Carley's still ill and can't go to DJ for Radio Cardiff with Liam. Instead, Liam goes alone and everyone is happy of his success. Jenna goes to meet Leeroy and she tells him that they have a connection, something she doesn't have with Jason.

On Jenna's big day, her and Natalee go down to London for the Nuts photoshoot. When the girls awake and realise they've gone without them, they're not happy and pack their bags to follow them there, and Carley's confused over Jenna and Natalee's sudden friendship. Shocked at how all of the girls have gone to England, the boys prove how Welsh they are by going camping in a field but it's ruined when sheep steal their tent. Returning home, the boys go all out to bring random girls back but it's ruined when the girls get back from London. Natalee finally apologises to Carley and says she'll spend more time with her, but then leaves her for Anthony. Back at the house, Chidgey and Carley discuss their situation and Jenna finally chooses Jason over Leeroy.

Whilst at the Valleywood photoshoot, the boys wreak havoc with the girls by dragging them around in mud leaving Lateysha angry with them. The group then decide to go to Swansea as Nicole is missing her friends, and it's awkward for Lateysha when Nicole's boyfriend arrives, who she once had a thing with. Natalee gets too drunk though and everyone returns to the house. Chidgey comforts Carley when she's feeling down and Jenna mistakenly thinks she's seen them kissing. The next morning Carley admits she doesn't feel guilty anymore because of Natalee's behaviour with Anthony, and Jenna receives a text from Leeroy asking her to meet him. Jenna stands by her decision though and sticks with Jason. On a girls night in, Jenna tells Natalee about Carley and Chidgey's "kiss" but Carley overhears and swears it isn't true. After all the bickering Carley confides in Leeroy. Jordan decides he's not happy with the lack of work from Carley so forces Liam to teach her how to DJ. That night, Natalee is far from impressed when she spots Anthony pulling a girl. As Chidgey also brings a girl back, he's soon let down when she changes her mind and ends up with Leeroy.

Natalee blames Chidgey the next morning for encouraging Anthony to get into bed with a girl and throws a bowl of cereal over him. Natalee then moves onto Anthony and tells him that they need to stay away from each other to avoid getting hurt. However that night, Natalee goes for revenge on a girls night out and kisses loads of boys. Carley also goes all out to prove she doesn't have feelings for Chidgey and tries to pull a boy, but then the boys gatecrash their night and she's immediately drawn to him. The pair get close and end up in bed together. Nicole attempts go-karting to practise how to drive a real car but it's a disaster when she falls out. With Valleywood approaching, Lateysha feels she's the only one taking it seriously. Jenna's mum visits and Natalee tells her about Jenna getting with Jason, so her and the twins fool her by swapping the twins around and discussing the situation. Natalee gives her approval for Chidgey and Carley before they go out on a date together and then get into bed with each other after their night out. A disaster in bed with Jason causes Jenna to be more drawn to Leeroy, and Natalee gives into temptation and gets back with Anthony. The next day Chidgey has no idea that Carley thinks that they're more involved than they actually are and she isn't impressed when he flirts with Millie that night.

As the night of Valleywood approaches, the group go for rehearsals but Carley is clearly troubled and can't take it anymore. She returns to the house, packs her bags and goes back to Cardiff without telling anyone. When everyone realises Carley is gone, Natalee and Chidgey pin the blame on each other. They all return to the house to find a letter from Carley and Natalee's left angry when Carley calls Chidgey her best friend. The night of Valleywood finally arrives and it all goes successful. Lateysha is horrified though when she discovers she was wrong about being the headline act and discovers Leeroy actually is. Jason pulls some girls and brings them back to the house leaving Jenna jealous, so Natalee stands by her friend and throws the girls out of the house. The next morning everyone packs their bags to return to Cardiff but they get a visit from Jordan and AK where they reveal heartbreaking news. They confess that they want to continue working with everyone except Nicole and Liam.

Cast
Anthony Suminski
Carley Belmonte
Darren Chidgey
Jason Suminski
Jenna Jonathan
Lateysha Grace
Leeroy Reed
Liam Powell
Natalee Harris
Nicole Morris

Duration

Key 

 = Features in this episode.
 = Arrives in the house.
 = Voluntarily leaves the house.
 = Removed from the house.
 = Returns to the house.
 = Features in this episode, outside the house.
 = Does not feature in this episode.
 = Leaves the series.

Episodes

{| class="wikitable plainrowheaders" style="width:100%"
|-style="color:white"
! style="background:#FFCC66;"| SeriesNo.
! style="background:#FFCC66;"| EpisodeNo.
! style="background:#FFCC66;"| Title
! style="background:#FFCC66;"| Original air date
! style="background:#FFCC66;"| Duration
! style="background:#FFCC66;"| UK viewers

|}

Ratings

References

2013 British television seasons